Whisper a Prayer is the third studio album by British singer-songwriter Mica Paris. It was released on 8 June 1993 by 4th & B'way Records, her last for the label. Recording sessions for the album commenced in the spring of 1992 and concluded the following spring with Paris co-writing four of the twelve songs and producing one. Whisper a Prayer features writing and production from Narada Michael Walden, Rod Temperton and Terry Britten all of whom were top record producers at the time.

The album has received acclaim from critics who complimented the quality of the writing and production in addition to Paris' voice and delivery of the songs. The album was a moderate commercial success, bettering its predecessor Contribution on the UK Albums Chart, debuting at number twenty. It was less successful in the US where it peaked at ninety-nine on the Top R&B/Hip-Hop Albums chart.

Four singles were released from the album, two of which were top thirty hits on the UK Singles Chart. Lead single "I Never Felt Like This Before" became Paris' highest appearance on the chart since her top-ten debut "My One Temptation", peaking at number fifteen. Second single from the album, "I Wanna Hold On to You" peaked at number twenty-seven and was the highest charting in the US, reaching forty-six on the Hot R&B/Hip-Hop Songs chart.

The Rod Temperton composition, "You Put a Move on My Heart", was covered and released by American recording artist Tamia and record producer Quincy Jones in 1995. Their version became a top twenty hit on the Hot R&B/Hip-Hop Songs chart.

Background

Following Paris' BPI platinum-certified debut album, So Good and Silver-certified second, Contribution, Paris became a mother, pushing back the recording of her third album by two years. In Billboard, Larry Flick explained 'her pregnancy provided some of the creative focus needed to formulate what appears to be her long-desired commercial breakthrough.' In the same article, Paris is quoted:

"I think if you listened to my last album ['Contribution'], you will detect a little confusion, which was how I felt about my life and career, actually [...] There was so much mayhem; so much tugging and pulling. But there was something in the experience of having my daughter, and in being free to take the time to truly consider where my life was heading. It was so positive. It gave me the clarity to decide on the kind of album I wanted to make"

Flick noted that the inclusion of 'pop/urban hit machine' Narada Michael Walden, who wrote produced and co-wrote several songs with Paris, including the single "I Wanna Hold Onto You", may be viewed as 'commercially calculated' by 'diehard fans of the more dense jazz/dance tone of Paris' past efforts.' Paris asserted that the pair had a spiritual bond which made their collaboration work, saying, "Narada and I found a common ground to vibe on. He's taught me so much about the craft of making music." Walden expressed, "It was important that this album had some of the hard, soulful grit of my other records, but it also needed a clean quality that's accessible to a lot of people".

Prior to working with Paris, Walden had produced hits for Aretha Franklin ("Who's Zoomin' Who?"), Whitney Houston ("How Will I Know"), Clarence Clemons ("You're a Friend of Mine"), Dionne Warwick ("No One There (To Sing Me a Love Song)"), Gladys Knight ("Licence to Kill"), Regina Belle ("Baby Come to Me"), Lisa Fischer ("How Can I Ease the Pain") and Mariah Carey ("Vision of Love"). Further contributors include, Terry Britten, Rod Temperton and Jon Lind. Previously, Britten had won the Grammy Award for Song of the Year in 1985 for Tina Turner's "What's Love Got to Do with It?" (which was later inducted into the Grammy Hall of Fame); Temperton penned the Michael Jackson hits "Rock with You", "Off the Wall" and "Thriller"; whilst Lind co-wrote Madonna's "Crazy for You" and Vanessa Williams's "Save the Best for Last", which both topped the US Hot 100, the latter being named "Song of the Year" by ASCAP in 1993.

Reception

Critical response

Whisper a Prayer has received general acclaim from critics. In a contemporary review by Entertainment Weekly, James Earl Hardy expressed, 'Mica Paris finally lives up to the sensation her debut single' and that 'Her breathy alto is equally as classy and confident with pop ("I Never Felt Like This Before") as it is with hip-hop soul ("You Got a Special Way") and sexy R&B ballads ("You Put a Move on My Heart")'. AllMusic editor, Andrew Hamilton listed "Positivity" and "Can't Seem to Make Up My Mind", both co-written by Paris, as "favorites", adding that "her original version of "You Put a Move on My Heart" sounds better than Tamia's version" featured on Quincy Jones' Jook Joint album. Hamilton also praised Paris' vocal performances, writing "she delivers these songs in her smooth, jazz- and blues-influenced, intense but relaxed style". In addition to this, Hamilton expressed that Paris "is the most exciting female vocalist to come along in some time" but noted that "unlike her first LP, which scored a minor R&B hit with "My One Temptation", none of these excellent songs made much of an impact".

In a retrospective review, BBC Music editor Daryl Easlea described Paris as "one of the UK’s greatest soul divas" and wrote that "working with what only could be deemed a stellar cast [...] Island looked at Whisper a Prayer as being Paris’ true breakthrough album". Easlea described the album as "a remarkable pedigree" thanks in part to "backing singers like Siedah Garrett, producers including Narada Michael Walden and Rod Temperton, and writers such as Graham Lyle on board". Easlea described "I Bless the Day" as "sweet and light, floating along with Paris’ emotive voice at once commanding and sensitive" and the "Drizabone-mixed swingbeat of Two in a Million" as "spry and sugary". However, Easlea wrote that "the only thing that lets the Whisper a Prayer down is its instrumentation". Using "You Put a Move on My Heart" as one such an example he wrote, "a song as beautiful and passionately delivered [...] you long for it being recorded at a different time, not with Paris in front of a keyboard with an orchestra setting button and a drum machine". He also noted the "90s contraptions [...] present and correct on the album’s opener, I Never Felt This Way Before", writing that "it may be ultra-smooth but the overall effect is like a cut-price version of a cut from Anita Baker's Rapture". In closing however, Easlea expressed 'Whisper a Prayer is one of the shining beacons of 90s UK soul'.

Andrew Hamilton also reviewed "You Put a Move on My Heart" favorably, writing "Mica Paris' original rendition of Rod Temperton's ballad supreme[...]shames Tamia's more successful rendition". Though he noted that the sales of Whisper a Prayer "pale in comparison" to Q's Jook Joint – on which Tamia's cover is featured – he wrote that "Paris' glorious tone, however, never pales; it glows like a warm fire as the devastating British woman squeezes the last drop of soul from the lyrics."

Commercial reception
Whisper a Prayer debuted and peaked at number twenty on the UK Albums Chart making it her second top twenty appearance on the chart. In its second week the album dropped one place to twenty-one and thirty in its third before making its last appearance on the chart at number sixty-one in its fourth week. In the US, Whisper a Prayer peaked at ninety-nine on the Top R&B/Hip-Hop Albums chart, where it spent a single week. It is Paris' last album to appear on any Billboard chart.

Singles

Four singles were released from Whisper a Prayer, the first being the Narada Michael Walden production "I Never Felt Like This Before", written by Walden and Sally Jo Dakota. "I Never Felt Like This Before" debuted at number twenty-three on the UK Singles Chart, rising and peaking at number fifteen in its second week, becoming Paris' third and last top twenty appearance on the chart after 1989's "Where is the Love" with Will Downing.

Walden also produced the second single, "I Wanna Hold on to You", which debuted and peaked at number twenty-seven on the UK Singles Chart whilst in the US, it peaked at forty-six on the Hot R&B/Hip-Hop Songs chart. A music video for "I Wanna Hold on to You" was directed by Matthew Rolston. Third and fourth singles "Two in a Million" and title track "Whisper a Prayer" were minor successes in the UK peaking at fifty-one and sixty-five respectively. "Whisper a Prayer" was also Paris' last charting single in the US, debuting and peaking at twenty-two on the Bubbling Under R&B/Hip-Hop Songs chart on October 23, 1993. "I Wanna Hold on to You" was sampled by 2Pac on "Nothing to Lose", posthumously released on the album R U Still Down? (Remember Me).

Track listing

Personnel
Credits obtained from the album's liner notes.

Visuals and imagery
 Design – Michael Nash
 Photography – Katerina Jebb

Performance credits
 Lead vocals – Mica Paris
 Background vocals – Mica Paris, Claytoven Richardson, Kitty Beethoven, Sandy Griffith, Tony Lindsay, Nicole 'Darlin' Nikki' Bradin, Nadirah Ali, Siedah Garrett, Debra Parson, Jennifer Caryn, Laurie 'Flame' Jones, Paul Johnson, Nikita Germaine, Skyler Jett, J.D. Nicholas

Instruments
 Bass – John Andrew Shreiner, Randy Hope-Taylor, Narada Michael Walden, Neil Stubenhaus
 Drums – John Andrew Shreiner, Alex Acuña, Maxton G. Beesley, John Robinson
 Guitar – Vernon 'Ice' Black, Paul Jackson Jr., John Andrew Shreiner, Jakko Jakszyk
 Keyboards – Mike Mani, John Andrew Shreiner, Louis Biancaniello, Howard Francis, Monty Seward, Frank Martin 
 Percussion – Narada Michael Walden, Maxton G. Beesley
 Piano – Phil Galdston, Larry Williams
 Saxophone – Steve Williamson
 Synthesizers – Erik Hanson, Monty Seward
 Violin – Sid Page

Technical and production
 Arrangement – Narada Michael Walden, Rod Temperton, Jon Lind, Phil Gladston, John Andrew Shreiner, David Campbell (strings), Frank Martin (strings)
 Conducting – David Campbell, Frank Martin
 Songwriters – Narada Michael Walden, Sally Jo Dakota, Mica Paris, Rod Temperton, Jon Lind, Phil Galdston, Wendy Waldman, Terry Britten, Graham Lyle, Sylvester Jackson, Mike Mani, Monty Seward, Deena Charles
 Engineering – Eric Rudd, Guy Defazio, Nick Wollage, Daren Klein, Moogie Canazio, Matt Forger, Louis 'Kingpin' Biancaniello
 Engineering assistants – Christopher Zerbe, Michael Aarvold, Daniel Clements, Dave Hecht, David Harrelson, John Malta, Paul Scriver, Greg Loskorn, Philip Reynolds, Tina Madison, Jeff 'G' Gray
 Mastering – Bernie Grundman
 Mixing – David 'Frazeman' Frazer, Mick Guzauski, Tommy Vicari, Martin Russel 
 Mixing assistants – Stephen Harrison, Kevin Becka, Eric Fitzgerald, Gabriel Sutter 
 Record producer – Narada Michael Walden, Mike Mani, Rod Temperton, Jon Lind, Paul Johnson, Driza Bone
 Programming – Mike Mani, John Andrew Shreiner, Louis 'Kingpin' Biancaniello, Frank Martin, Monty Seward

Charts

References

1993 albums
Mica Paris albums
Island Records albums
Albums arranged by David Campbell (composer)
Albums produced by Narada Michael Walden